Tigress are a British rock band from Chelmsford, England. Formed in September 2015, the band consists of vocalist Katy Jackson, guitarists Tom Harrison and Sean Bishop, bassist Jack Divey and drummer Josh Coombes. The band is currently signed to Humble Angel Records. They were previously signed to LAB Records where they released their debut EP Human on 13 November 2015, follow up EP Like It Is on 12 May 2017 and 2018 EP Who Cares. All three releases were met with much acclaim across a number of major and independent music publications.

History 
Tigress originally performed under the name of The Hype Theory, and during this time the band's sound was far more pop-rock and pop-punk focused. They gained traction after becoming one of the finalists for the Red Bull Bedroom Jam competition in 2011, which allowed them to perform at a number of high profile festivals that summer, including Sonisphere and Download. As The Hype Theory, they released their debut album "Glory Days" on 10 October, 2011, and its follow-up "Captives" on 27 May, 2013, both through Small Town Records.

On 27 August, 2015, the band announced that they had officially changed their name to Tigress with immediate effect, and would subsequently no longer perform any material released as The Hype Theory.

Tigress released their debut EP Human on 13 November 2015. It was co-produced by You Me at Six guitarist Max Helyer and John Mitchell at Outhouse Studios in Reading and mixed by Romesh Dodangoda. The band's first show was performing at the Vans Warped Tour UK kick-off party at the Brooklyn Bowl in London on 14 September 2015. This was followed by a UK tour with Metro Station and a slot at the Vans Warped Tour UK at Alexandra Palace, London on 18 October 2015.

In support of the Human EP release, 2016 saw Tigress go out on a short headline tour in June which included a sold-out show in the band's hometown of Chelmsford. The band also played with Alvarez Kings and Fort Hope. In late 2016, the band went into Middle Farm Studios to record their Like It Is EP with Peter Miles.

In March 2017 the band went on a UK and mainland Europe tour with Counterfeit. They were joined by Decade in mainland Europe and Faux in the UK. Prior to the Counterfeit support tour, TIGRESS played Seaway's headline London show in February. They were joined by WSTR. On 12 May 2017, the band released the Like It Is EP. This was followed by a set at The Great Escape Festival in Brighton, performing with Green Day at British Summer Time in Hyde Park and a tour of Russia and Eastern Europe with Billy Talent. In October 2017, Tigress showcased at BBC Music Introducing hosts Amplify, supported The One Hundred in London and performed at 2Q Festival in Lincoln.

February 2018 saw TIGRESS open for Japan's Man With A Mission in London, followed by an appearance at Spring Break Festival in Poland on 21 April. The band supported InMe in May, which was followed by the release of their third EP Who Cares. June saw the band perform on the Avalanche Stage at Download Festival. Towards the end of the year the band opened for The Xcerts and Skindred.

May 2019 saw Tigress play Hit The North Festival in Newcastle. This was followed by a tour of the UK and Germany with Story Untold and Between You And Me. The end of the month saw TIGRESS release a cover of Massive Attack's Teardrop.

In June 2019 Tigress played their first ever festival in Germany, performing at Theatron Pfingstfestival in Munich.

July 2019 saw the band open for Bring Me The Horizon in Bologna, Italy. Enter Shikari were also on the bill.

In early October 2019, Tigress went on a headline tour of the UK playing shows in Glasgow, Liverpool, Manchester, Birmingham and London. Towards the end of October, the band supported Skindred at Cwmbran Stadium in Cwmbran, Wales.

In March 2020, Tigress announced they had signed to Humble Angel Records. 

In May 2020, Tigress were part of Five4Five Fest, a brand new stay at home online festival raising money for NHS Charities Together. The band played alongside Don Broco, Deaf Havana, Yonaka, Hot Milk, Stay Free, Lizzy Farrall, Rob Lynch, Lacey, Enter Shikari, As It Is, Fatherson, Trash Boat, Roam, The Dangerous Summer and Wargasm.

In October 2020, Tigress released their single 'Choke', the song was accompanied by an animated music video by Aidan Stadler. The song was produced by Adrian Bushby and mastered by Harry Hess. 

In April 2021, Tigress announced their debut album "Pura Vida" (produced by Adrian Bushby and mastered by Harry Hess), followed up by the release of single 'Disconnect'. Josh Coombes, drummer of the band, directed the music video for the single. 

In August 2021, Tigress released 'F.L.Y.', the third single from their debut album. "Pura Vida".

In September 2021, Tigress released their debut album "Pura Vida". 

In November 2021, Tigress embarked on a co-headline tour of the UK with Bleak Soul (fronted by ex. As It Is guitarist Benjamin Langford-Biss). The band played in Glasgow, Newcastle, Manchester, Liverpool, Birmingham and Bristol. Tigress and Bleak Soul were scheduled to perform in Brighton, Leeds and London, but were unable to do so, due to members of their touring party testing positive for COVID-19.

In May 2022, the band were main support to Feeder in Newcastle and Nottingham on their Torpedo UK tour.

In June 2022, the band were main support to Billy Talent on their UK tour. The band opened for Evanescence in Rostock, Germany and Tampere, Finland. The show in Tampere, was the band's first arena show. En-route to Tampere, Finnair lost all of Tigress' backline resulting in the band playing their first ever arena with none of their own gear. The band also opened for Spiritbox in Utrecht, Netherlands and Hamburg, Germany. 

In August 2022, the band were main support to Anti-Flag in Nottingham and London on their 'Welcome To 1984' UK tour. The band also performed at Reading and Leeds Festival, playing on the Festival Republic Stage.

In September 2022, the band performed two UK headline shows in London and Birmingham.

In November 2022, the band performed at Pick It Up Festival in High Wycombe with WSTR.

In December 2022, the band were main support to Evanescence in Lisbon, Portugal and Madrid, Spain. The band also released an acoustic take of their song 'A Letter To Death (Cry Your Heart Out)', titling it 'A Letter to Death (Reimagined)'.

The band are managed by Satvir Bhamra. Bhamra currently works for 0207 Def Jam, the London-based UK arm of Def Jam Recordings, having previously spent time at BMG, Universal Music Catalogue, Warner Music Group, EMI and Sony Music. Tigress are booked by ITB (International Talent Booking) for the world excluding North America.

Tigress receive regular radio play from BBC Radio 1, BBC Introducing, Kerrang! Radio, Radio X, Triple J in Australia and have seen press coverage from Kerrang! Magazine, Rock Sound, Upset, The Metro and Alternative Press.

Band members 
 Katy Jackson – Vocals
 Tom Harrison – Guitar
 Jack Divey – Bass
 Sean Bishop – Guitar
 Josh Coombes – Drums

Discography 
Studio Albums
 Pura Vida (2021)
Extended Plays
 Human (2015)
 Like It Is (2017)
 Who Cares (2018)
Singles
 Alive (2015)
 Power Lines (2016)
 Give Me A Chance (2017)
 Headaches (2017)
 Bring Me Down (2018)
 Hangman (2018)
 Over Your Love (2018)
 Teardrop (2019)
 Choke (2020)
 Disconnect (2021)
 A Letter To Death (Reimagined) (2022)

References 

Chelmsford
English rock music groups
Musical groups from Essex
2015 establishments in England
Female-fronted musical groups